This is the list of programs broadcast by Create.

A
America Quilts Creatively
America Sews with Sue Hausmann
American Workshop
America's Test Kitchen
Anywhere, Alaska
Around the House with Matt & Shari
Ask This Old House

B
Baking with Julia
Barbecue America (also known as BBQ America)
Barbecue University with Steven Raichlen
Beads, Baubles & Jewels
The Best of the Joy of Painting
Best Recipes in the World with Mark Bittman
BBQ With Franklin
Burt Wolf: Taste of Freedom
Burt Wolf: Travels and Traditions
Burt Wolf: What We Eat

C
Caprial and John's Kitchen: Cooking for Family and Friends
Chefs A' Field: Culinary Adventures That Begin On The Farm
Chefs of Napa Valley
Christina Cooks
Ciao Italia
Classic Woodworking
Coastal Cooking with John Shields
Cooking 80-20 with Robin Shea
The Cooking Odyssey
Cooking with Nick Stellino
Cooking with Todd English
Cook's Country
Cultivating Life

D
Daisy Cooks! With Daisy Martinez
Donna's Day
Double Happiness

E
Ellie's Real Good Food
Endless Feast
Equitrekking
Essential Pepin

F
Fit 2 Stitch
Flavors of America with Chef Jim Coleman
Fons and Porter's Love of Quilting
Food Trip with Todd English
For Your Home
The French Chef (otherwise known as French Chef Classics)

G
Garden Smart
Gary Spetz's Painting Wild Places! With Watercolors
Glass with Vicki Payne
Globe Trekker
Gourmet's Diary of a Foodie
Grilling Maestros
Growing a Greener World

H
Healthful Indian Flavors with Alamelu
Holiday Table with Chris Fennimore and Dede Wilson
Hometime
How to Cook Everything

I
Ireland: The Roads Taken with Tommy Makem
In the Americas with David Yetman

J
J Schwanke's Life In Bloom
Jacques Pépin: Fast Food My Way
Jacques Pépin: Heart And Soul
Jane Butel's Southwestern Kitchen
Jazzy Vegetarian
Joanne Weir's Cooking Class
Joanne Weir's Cooking Confidence
The Joy of Painting
Julia and Jacques Cooking at Home

K
Katie Brown Workshop
Kitchen Sessions with Charlie Trotter
Knit and Crochet Now

L
Lap Quilting with Georgia Bonesteel
Legacy List with Matt Paxton
Lidia's Family Table
Lidia's Italian-American Kitchen
Lidia's Italy
Lidia's Kitchen
Lucky Chow

M
Martha Bakes
Martha Stewart's Cooking School
Martha's Sewing Room
Martin Yan's Chinatowns
Martin Yan's Taste Of Vietnam
Martin Yan's Quick & Easy
Master Class at Johnson & Wales
Mexico: One Plate at a Time
Moveable Feast with Fine Cooking

N
New Jewish Cuisine with Jeff Nathan and Friends
New Orleans Cooking with Kevin Belton
New Scandinavian Cooking with Andreas Viestad
New Scandinavian Cooking with Tina Nordström
The New Yankee Workshop
Nick Stellino: Cooking with Friends
Nick Stellino's Family Kitchen
Nick Stellino: Storytelling in the Kitchen

O
One Stroke Painting with Donna Dewberry

P
P. Allen Smith's Garden Home
PAINT! PAINT! PAINT!
Paint, Paper and Crafts
Painting and Travel with Roger and Sarah Bansemer
Passport to Adventure
Pati's Mexican Table

Q
Quilt Central

R
Rick Steves' Europe
Rick Steves' Europe Classics
Rough Cut with Fine Woodworking
Rough Cut - Woodworking with Tommy Mac
Rudy Maxa's World

S
Scrapbook Memories
Seasoned Traveler
Seasonings with Dede Wilson
Seasonings with Dede Wilson: Cooking and Entertaining for Special Occasions
Sewing with Nancy
Simply Ming
Smart Gardening
Smart Travels: Europe
Smart Travels: Pacific RIM

T
This Old House
Tommy Makem's Ireland
Travels In Mexico and the Caribbean with Shari Belafonte

V
The Victory Garden

W
Weir Cooking in the City
Wine, Food & Friends with Karen MacNeil
Woodturning Workshop
World's Fair of Quilts: for the Love of Fabric

Y
Yan Can Cook: Spice Kingdom
You're The Chef

References

Create
Create
Create, Programs